Studio was a Swedish electronic music band. They have been described as the missing link between The Cure and Lindstrøm - while simultaneously touching upon Can, Neu, Happy Mondays and The Smiths -  in their creation of an "afrobeat-dub-disco-indie-pop" adventure. Their album West Coast was chosen by Rough Trade in London as one of the 10 best albums of 2007 and they have remixed artists such as Kylie Minogue and A Mountain of One.

Discography

CD/download
West Coast (2007)
Yearbook 1 (2007)
Yearbook 2 (2008)

LP, 12" and 7"
West Side Parts 1 and 2 (2007) (7", limited edition of 1,000 copies)
West Coast (album)|West Coast (Second Edition, double LP)
Life's a Beach! Todd Terje and Prins Thomas Remixes (12")
West Coast (2006) (LP, limited edition of 500 copies)
No Comply (2006) (12", limited edition of 500 copies)

Remixes
 Shout Out Louds - Possible
 Rubies - A Room Without A Key
 Love Is All - Turn The Radio Off (Remake)
 A Mountain of One - Brown Piano (Remake)
 Studio/Brennan Green - East Side and Escape From Chinatown
 Kylie - 2 Hearts
 Williams - Love On A Real Train

External links
 
Studio on Myspace
 Studio at Last.fm
 Pitchfork review of Yearbook 1
 Stylus review of West Coast

Electronic music duos
Musical groups disestablished in 2011
Musical groups established in 2001
Musical groups from Gothenburg
Swedish electronic music groups